The 2009–10 Weber State Wildcats men's basketball team represented Weber State University during the 2009–10 NCAA Division I men's basketball season. This was head coach Randy Rahe's fourth season at Weber State. The Wildcats competed in the Big Sky Conference and played their home games at the Dee Events Center.

Weber State won the Big Sky regular season championship for the third time in the last four years and as the champion hosted the semifinals and championship game of the 2010 Big Sky men's basketball tournament. The Wildcats lost to Montana in the championship game and were invited to the 2010 National Invitation Tournament where they lost in the first round for the second consecutive year.

Roster
Source

Schedule and results
Source
All times are Mountain

|-
!colspan=9| Exhibition

|-
!colspan=9| Regular Season

|-
!colspan=9| 2010 Big Sky men's basketball tournament

|-
!colspan=9| 2010 National Invitation Tournament

References

Weber State Wildcats
Weber State Wildcats men's basketball seasons
Weber State
Weber State Wildcats men's basketball
Weber State Wildcats men's basketball